Teresa Geiger (born September 16, 1988) also known by her stage name Teddy Geiger, is an American singer-songwriter and record producer.

Early life
Geiger was born on September 16, 1988, to Lorilyn Rizzo-Bridges and John Theodore Geiger, I. She has two siblings, brother A. J. and sister Rachel. Geiger attended McQuaid Jesuit High School.

Career 
Originally signed to Columbia Records as a teenager, Geiger's debut album, Underage Thinking, released in 2006, peaked at number eight on the US Billboard 200 albums chart and spawned two singles, "For You I Will (Confidence)" and "These Walls."

Geiger's second album, The Last Fears, was released in 2013 through iTunes and Spotify. The album involved many peers and collaborators including John Ryan, A Great Big World, Holly Miranda, Theo Katzman, as well as Levon Helm's producer and musical director Larry Campbell.

Geiger released her third album, LillyAnna under the name Teddy <3 or teddy❤️, in 2018. The album received some acclaim from the likes of New York Times, Paper, Billboard, and Rolling Stone.

Personal life 
Geiger came out as a trans woman in October 2017, and has said that she "knew she was female at 5 years old." She has also said that she intends to keep the name Teddy and use female pronouns.

She was engaged to Canadian actress Emily Hampshire, but they ended their engagement in June 2019 after seven months.

Discography

Albums

Singles

As lead artist

As featured artist

Promotional singles

Other appearances

Songwriting and production credits

Television and movie appearances

References

External links 

 
 

1988 births
Living people
21st-century American singers
21st-century American women singers
American LGBT singers
American LGBT songwriters
American women pop singers
American women record producers
LGBT people from New York (state)
LGBT record producers
Musicians from Buffalo, New York
Musicians from Rochester, New York
Record producers from New York (state)
Transgender singers
Transgender songwriters
Transgender women musicians